The 1935 season was the Hawthorn Football Club's 11th season in the Victorian Football League and the 34th overall.

Fixture

Premiership Season

Ladder

References

Hawthorn Football Club seasons